GMST may refer to:

 Global mean surface temperature, sometimes abbreviated as Global surface temperature (GST)
 Greenwich Mean Sidereal Time, a time scale based on Earth's rate of rotation measured relative to celestial objects